John Masiakowski (August 31, 1874 - ?) was a stationer from Milwaukee, Wisconsin who served one term as a Socialist member of the Wisconsin State Assembly for the 14th Milwaukee County district (14th and 24th wards of the City of Milwaukee).

Background 
Masiakowski was born in Milwaukee on August 31, 1874, and attended parochial school and public school of the twelfth ward. He enlisted in the Hospital Corps of the United States Army, and served three years during the Spanish–American War. He served for two years as a deputy sheriff, and at the time of his election to the Assembly had been operating a school supply and confectionery store.

Assembly service 
Masiakowski had never held any public office (except that in 1917 he was appointed by Mayor of Milwaukee Dan Hoan as commissioner of the Community Christmas Board) until elected to the Assembly in 1918 to succeed Democratic incumbent Thomas Szewczykowski (who did not run for re-election). He received 1,239 votes to 1,086 for Republican  Klemens Borucki and 1,020 for Democrat Frank Krempinski. He was assigned to the standing committee on elections.

He did not run for re-election in 1920, and was succeeded by fellow Socialist Stephen Stolowski.

References 

1874 births
Military personnel from Wisconsin
American military personnel of the Spanish–American War
United States Army soldiers
American deputy sheriffs
Members of the Wisconsin State Assembly
Politicians from Milwaukee
Stationers (people)
Socialist Party of America politicians from Wisconsin
Year of death missing